Amama may refer to:

 Amama Mbabazi, Ugandan lawyer and politician
 Sixtinus Amama, Dutch theologian